The following is a list of articles that contain a lists of traffic collisions, or list of people who died in traffic collisions.

Lists of traffic collisions
List of traffic collisions (before 2000)
List of traffic collisions (2000–present)
List of traffic collisions by death toll

Lists of deaths in traffic collisions
List of deaths by motorcycle crash
List of people who died in traffic collisions

See also
List of car crash songs
List of level crossing crashes
List of professional cyclists who died during a race
List of racing drivers who died in racing crashes

Lists of road transport incidents
Traffic collisions
Lists of transport lists